Damir Džumhur was the defending champion, but lost in the quarterfinals to Stan Wawrinka.

Dominic Thiem won the title after defeating Martin Kližan 6–3, 6–1 in the final. Notably, this was Kližan's first defeat in a deciding match, after 10 consecutive titles at ATP World Tour level.

The tournament marked the last appearance of Mikhail Youzhny in professional tennis.

Seeds
The top four seeds receive a bye into the second round.

Draw

Finals

Top half

Bottom half

Qualifying

Seeds

Qualifiers

Lucky loser

Qualifying draw

First qualifier

Second qualifier

Third qualifier

Fourth qualifier

References

External links
 Main draw
 Qualifying draw

2018 Singles
2018 ATP World Tour